The Russia women's national under-16 and under-17 basketball team is a national basketball team of Russia, administered by the Russian Basketball Federation.
It represents the country in international under-16 and under-17 (under age 16 and under age 17) women's basketball competitions.

After the 2022 Russian invasion of Ukraine, FIBA banned Russian teams and officials from participating in FIBA 3x3 Basketball competitions.

History

FIBA Under-17 Basketball World Cup

FIBA Europe Under-16 Championship

See also
Russia women's national basketball team
Russia women's national under-19 basketball team
Soviet Union women's national under-17 basketball team

References

External links
Archived records of Russia team participations

u
Women's national under-17 basketball teams